Avenue Émile Zola is a station on Line 10 of the Paris Métro. Located in the 15th arrondissement, it is situated at the eastern end of Avenue Émile Zola, at the intersection of the Rue du Commerce and Rue Fondary.

History
The station was opened under the name Commerce on 13 July 1913 as part of the original section of Line 8 between Beaugrenelle (now Charles Michels) and Opéra.

On 29 July 1937, Line 10 was extended from Duroc to La Motte-Picquet – Grenelle; the section of Line 8 between La Motte-Picquet – Grenelle and Porte d'Auteuil, including Commerce was transferred to Line 10. The same day, it was renamed Avenue Émile Zola because a new station named Commerce opened on Line 8. The station commemorates Émile Zola, a prolific French writer of the 19th century.

In 2013, the station was used by 1,476,223 passengers, making it the 280th busiest out of 302 on the Métro network.

Station layout

Gallery

References

Paris Métro stations in the 15th arrondissement of Paris
Railway stations in France opened in 1913